Autochloris patagiata is a moth of the subfamily Arctiinae. It was described by Harrison Gray Dyar Jr. in 1909. It is found in Mexico.

References

Arctiinae
Moths described in 1909
Moths of Central America